Churchill is an unincorporated community in Renville County, Minnesota, United States.

Notes

Unincorporated communities in Renville County, Minnesota
Unincorporated communities in Minnesota